Rolf Günther (8 January 1913 – August 1945) was a German functionary who served in the Schutzstaffel (SS) as an Sturmbannführer and who acted as deputy to Adolf Eichmann. He first joined the Sturmabteilung (SA) in 1929 and became dedicated to the Nazi cause.

Günther was responsible for the deportation of Jews from Salonika to Auschwitz concentration camp, with assistance from Alois Brunner. His brother Hans Günther was head of the Central Office for Jewish Emigration in Prague.

Günther committed suicide by poison in August 1945 while being held by the Americans in an Ebensee prison, however Adolf Eichmann believed him to have definitely survived the war and made his way to an unknown location overseas.

References

Sources

1913 births
1945 suicides
SS-Sturmbannführer
Holocaust perpetrators in Greece
Military personnel from Erfurt
Nazis who committed suicide in prison custody
Gestapo personnel
Reich Security Main Office personnel
Nazis who committed suicide in Austria
Suicides by cyanide poisoning